Dicle University is a public university located in Diyarbakır, Turkey, and one of the largest higher education institution. Vocational schools are located in Ergani, Çermik, Çüngüş, Bismil, and Silvan

History
Dicle University's early history is linked with Diyarbakır Eğitim Enstitüsü which was chartered on 1962. The Faculty of Medicine, which was opened in 1966 as a part of Ankara University, forms the nucleus of the present Dicle University. With the opening of the Faculty of Art and Sciences in 1974, Dicle University was officially founded including two faculties. The Faculty of Dentistry was founded in 1976 and the Faculty of Agriculture in 1981. The name Diyarbakir University was changed to Dicle University in 1982. The Faculty of Engineering and Architecture, The Faculty of Law, The Faculty of Education, three graduate schools and five schools were opened as new institutions of the University.

Today there are 11 faculties, four schools, 11 vocational schools, three graduate schools, one state conservatory, and eight research and application centres under the administration of the university.

Dicle University is at the centre of the GAP.

Faculties 
 Ziya Gökalp Faculty of Education
 Faculty of Science
 Faculty of Literature
 Faculty of Dentistry
 Faculty of Law
 Faculty of Medicine
 Faculty of Veterinary Medicine
 Faculty of Agriculture
 Faculty of Engineering
 Faculty of Architecture
 Faculty of Theology
 Faculty of Economics and Administrative Sciences
 Faculty of Communication

Graduate schools 
 Graduate School of Social Sciences
 Graduate School of Health Sciences
 Graduate School of Science

Vocational schools 
 Atatürk School of Health
 School of Physical Education and Sports
 School of Civil Aviation
 School of Foreign Language
 Diyarbakir Vocational School
 Bismil Vocational School
 Çermik Vocational School
 Çüngüş Vocational School
 Ergani Vocational School
 Silvan Vocational School
 Atatürk Vocational School of Health Sciences.

Research centers  
 Continuing Education Center
 Atatürk's principles and reforms Research Center
 Social Research Center
 Environmental Issues Application and Research Center
 GAP Application and Research Center
 Solar Energy Application and Research Center
 Liver Diseases Application and Research Center
 Psychological and Social Counselling Application and Research Center
 Medical Sciences Application and Research Center
 Natural Disasters Research Center

Notable alumni
 Osman Baydemir - politician, former Mayor of Diyarbakır
 Ayla Akat Ata - politician
Tahir Elçi - lawyer
Feridun Çelik, politician, former Mayor of Diyarbakır
Sara Kaya, former mayor of Nusaybin
Ebru Günay, politician and spokeswoman of the Peoples' Democratic Party (HDP)

Related EU universities
Germany
 University of Bremen
 University of Osnabrück
 University of Duisburg-Essen
 University of Göttingen
 University of Münster
 University of Applied Sciences Düsseldorf
 Anhalt University of Applied Sciences
Romania
 University of Medicine and Pharmacy of Târgu Mureş
 Alexandru Ioan Cuza University
 1 Decembrie 1918 University, Alba Iulia
 Dimitrie Cantemir Christian University
 University of Agricultural Sciences and Veterinary Medicine and  universities in countries in Europe.

See also
 List of universities in Turkey
 Diyarbakır
 Tigris

External links
Dicle University website 
Catalogue 
Katalog 
Dicle University Office of International Affairs 
Dicle University LLP/ Erasmus office 
Dicle University ELT department

References

Universities and colleges in Turkey
State universities and colleges in Turkey
Diyarbakır
Educational institutions established in 1966
Buildings and structures in Diyarbakır
1966 establishments in Turkey